The Mark Trail Wilderness was designated in 1991 and currently consists of . It is named in honor of Mark Trail, a daily newspaper comic strip created by the American cartoonist Ed Dodd. The Wilderness is located within the borders of the Chattahoochee National Forest in White, Towns, and Union counties, Georgia.  The Wilderness is managed by the United States Forest Service and is part of the National Wilderness Preservation System.

The highest elevation in the Mark Trail Wilderness is the  peak of Horsetrough Mountain.  Fourteen miles (21 km) of the Appalachian Trail cross the Wilderness.  The Wilderness features other peaks and Horsetrough Falls on the headwaters of the Chattahoochee River.  The Tray Mountain Wilderness is located across State Route 75 to the east.

References

External links 
Wilderness.net entry for the Mark Trail Wilderness
Mark Trail Wilderness on Recreation.gov

Wilderness areas of Georgia (U.S. state)
Protected areas of the Appalachians
Protected areas of Towns County, Georgia
Protected areas of Union County, Georgia
Protected areas of White County, Georgia
Protected areas established in 1991
Chattahoochee-Oconee National Forest
1991 establishments in Georgia (U.S. state)